New Zealand Open may refer to: 

New Zealand Open, the leading men's golf tournament in New Zealand
New Zealand Open (badminton), an international badminton tournament held in New Zealand.
New Zealand Open (darts)
New Zealand Open (tennis), international tennis tournament held in Auckland